The 2022 Stanley Cup Final was the championship series of the National Hockey League's (NHL) 2021–22 season and the culmination of the 2022 Stanley Cup playoffs. The series was between the Eastern Conference and two-time defending Stanley Cup champion Tampa Bay Lightning and the Western Conference champion Colorado Avalanche. The Avalanche won the best-of-seven series, four games to two, for their third championship in franchise history. Colorado had home ice advantage in the series with the better regular season record.

The series began on June 15, and concluded on June 26. With the Government of Canada allowing cross-border travel for fully vaccinated players and team personnel between Canada and the United States, the league was able to return to its usual two conference alignment and reinstate its standard playoff format that was used from 2014–2019, before the COVID-19 pandemic. The Final was still pushed from the usual start date in late May for the third consecutive year, this time due to a scheduled break in the regular season that coincided with the league's planned participation in the 2022 Winter Olympics, though the league's players ultimately did not participate in the Olympics. When NHL Commissioner Gary Bettman tested positive for COVID-19, NHL Deputy Commissioner Bill Daly took over the presentation of the Conn Smythe Trophy and the Stanley Cup. This was the first time since 1992 that Gary Bettman did not give the presentation.

Paths to the Final

Tampa Bay Lightning

This was Tampa Bay's third consecutive Final appearance and fifth overall. They won the prior (2020, 2021) two Stanley Cups and have won three in franchise history. They were the first team to clinch three consecutive Final appearances since the 1983–1985 Edmonton Oilers. The Lightning joined the Montreal Canadiens (1976–1980) and New York Islanders (1980–1984) for becoming the only teams in league history to post at least eleven consecutive playoff series victories.

Captain Steven Stamkos led the team in scoring with 106 points during the regular season. Defenceman Victor Hedman scored 85 points, eclipsing the previous Tampa Bay record for defenceman, which Hedman set in 2017. During the off-season, the Lightning signed goaltender Brian Elliott, defenceman Zach Bogosian, and forwards Pierre-Edouard Bellemare and Corey Perry via free agency. They also opted to re-sign forwards Brayden Point and Ross Colton and defenceman Cal Foote with Patrick Maroon re-signing during the season. At the trade deadline, the Lightning acquired forwards Brandon Hagel and Nick Paul. For Corey Perry, this was his third straight Finals appearance with three different teams (Dallas Stars in 2020, Montreal Canadiens in 2021), the first player to accomplish this feat since Marian Hossa did it with the Pittsburgh Penguins in 2008, Detroit Red Wings in 2009, and Chicago Blackhawks in 2010.

The Lightning finished third in the Atlantic Division gaining 110 points with a  record. Tampa Bay defeated the Toronto Maple Leafs in the First Round in seven games, followed by a four-game sweep of their intrastate rival, the Florida Panthers, during the Second Round, and then triumphed over the New York Rangers in the Eastern Conference Final in six games.

Colorado Avalanche

This was Colorado's third appearance in the Final. They won their two prior appearances with their most recent against the New Jersey Devils in 2001.

Mikko Rantanen led the team in points, scoring 92 overall. Goaltender Darcy Kuemper started 57 times for the Avalanche, obtaining 37 wins in the process. However, during Game 1 of their Conference Final series, Kuemper left the game with an upper-body injury. Backup goaltender Pavel Francouz finished the opening game after replacing Kuemper and started the remaining games of the series as a result. During the off-season, the Avalanche traded for Kuemper and forward Kurtis MacDermid. They also picked up free agent Darren Helm. They re-signed defenceman Cale Makar, captain Gabriel Landeskog, and Francouz. Nearing the trade deadline, the Avalanche acquired Josh Manson, Nico Sturm, Artturi Lehkonen, and Andrew Cogliano.

The Avalanche finished the season with 119 points via a  record, grabbing the Central Division title and first place in the Western Conference. Colorado swept the Nashville Predators in four games during the First Round, then defeated the St. Louis Blues in six games during the Second Round, before sweeping the Edmonton Oilers in the Western Conference Final.

Game summaries 
Note: The numbers in parentheses represent each player's total goals or assists to that point of the entire playoffs.

Game one

In game one, the Avalanche controlled the first period scoring three times compared to the Lightning's one goal. Colorado's captain Gabriel Landeskog began the scoring, pushing the puck past Lightning goalie Andrei Vasilevskiy when Mikko Rantanen's shot barely squeaked under the goaltenders pads. The next goal came when defenceman Victor Hedman's clearing attempt got picked by Nathan MacKinnon, whose pass to Valeri Nichushkin made it 2–0. The Lightning halved Colorado's lead when Brayden Point's dump-in was retrieved by Nick Paul who broke in and dangled out Avalanche goaltender Darcy Kuemper to make 2–1. The Avalanche regained the two-goal lead five minutes later when Tampa was in a 5-on-3 penalty kill. MacKinnon's shot got blocked and on the rebound he passed back to Landeskog who set up Rantanen for a wrist shot that got tipped in by Artturi Lehkonen. In the second period, the Lightning got two goals to tie the game. Ondrej Palat scored the first goal as he and Nikita Kucherov entered the zone with the latter going inside-out on Devon Toews to set up Palat for the tip-in. 1:48 later, the Lightning continuing their offensive zone attack had a pass back to Mikhail Sergachev from Brandon Hagel whose shot through traffic went off the post and into the net. The third period did not have any scoring albeit the Avalanche firing 12 shots compared to the Lightning's 5 shots, thus the game went into overtime. In overtime, as the Lightning attempted to clear the zone, J. T. Compher picked up the loose puck and shot it, but it was blocked by a Lightning defenceman. The puck then came to Nichushkin who passed to Andre Burakovsky and he fired a snap shot past Vasilevskiy to give Colorado a 4–3 victory.

Game two

The Avalanche routed the Lightning in game two. In the first period, after Lightning defenceman Ryan McDonagh got penalized for roughing J. T. Compher, a power-play ensued for Colorado. During it, Andre Burakovsky led a cross-ice pass to Valeri Nichushkin's tip-in goal to give the Avalanche an early 1–0 lead. The Avalanche then grabbed a 2–0 lead when a 2-on-1 rush with Andrew Cogliano and Josh Manson led to the latter's wrist shot under Andrei Vasilevskiy's blocker. Burakovsky then made it 3–0 when the Avalanche on an offensive zone rush had Mikko Rantanen's shot rebound to Burakovsky for the quick tip-in. Burakovsky almost made it 4–0 when he was given a breakaway thanks to Rantanen's lead pass. In the second period, the Avalanche continued their offensive zone coverage allowing Rantanen to centre a pass to Nichushkin to make it 4–0. The Avalanche then made it 5–0 when the Lightning misplayed a pass leading Darren Helm and Logan O'Connor on a 2-on-1 break for which the former's wrist shot went over Vasilevskiy's glove. O'Connor was also given a breakaway chance to make it 6–0, but the Lightning goaltender stopped that. In the third period, as Rantanen was in the penalty box for tripping, the Lightning gave the puck away to Cale Makar who with Andrew Cogliano on another 2-on-1 made it 6–0. Ondrej Palat then got called for cross checking and on the ensuing power-play, Nathan MacKinnon made a pass to Rantanen, who quickly passed to Makar for his second goal of the evening to make 7–0. With frustrations boiling over for Tampa Bay, four of their players were called for roughing for which Colorado retaliated with their own roughing calls. However, the Avalanche claimed a 7–0 victory with Darcy Kuemper stopping the 16 shots he faced.

Game three

In game three, the Lightning showed more offence than their previous two games. However, the Avalanche began the scoring in the first period. After a coach's challenge revealed Valeri Nichushkin's goal was offside, and then Ondrej Palat got called for high-sticking, Colorado went on the power-play. During the power-play, Cale Makar set up Mikko Rantanen for a quick shot through traffic which pinballed off Andrei Vasilevskiy and Erik Cernak for an easy tap-in for Avalanche captain Gabriel Landeskog. The Lightning tied the game less than five minutes later when the Avalanche gave the puck away to Anthony Cirelli who passed to Patrick Maroon and then back again to Cirelli who tried to deke out Darcy Kuemper except his mishandling of the puck went five-hole through Kuemper. The Lightning then gained the lead for the first time in this series after Devon Toews fanned on a pass leading to a breakout of Tampa Bay. Palat and Nikita Kucherov went down the ice, with Steven Stamkos trailing. Palat passed back to Stamkos who set up Palat again for a snap shot that went past Kuemper for a 2–1 lead. In the second period, the Lightning outscored the Avalanche, four goals to one. The first goal came off a turn-over from Colorado's Josh Manson who gave the puck to Victor Hedman setting up an open Nick Paul for a 3–1 lead. However, the Avalanche minimized the Lightning's lead to one goal, when on the power-play, Rantanen and Makar set up Landeskog's snap shot goal. Tampa Bay regained their two-goal lead when Kucherov and Stamkos lead the offensive zone rush with Kucherov back-handing a pass to an open Stamkos for a quick wrist shot. Patrick Maroon made it 5–2 deking out the defencemen with his shot rolling up Kuemper's blocker to the top of the net. Corey Perry made it 6–2 when the Lightning were on the power-play, tipping in a shot by Palat that went over Kuemper. Although the third period had no goals scored, both teams leveled their frustration at each other with both Logan O'Connor and Ross Colton fighting and Patrick Maroon and Andrew Cogliano both squaring off after the whistle resulting in misconducts.

Game four

In game four, the Lightning and Avalanche traded off periods where one team dominated the shot clock. The first period saw Tampa Bay fire 17 shots compared to Colorado's four shots. The third shot for the Lightning 36 seconds into the game gave Tampa Bay their first goal when Erik Cernak's shot bounced off of goaltender Darcy Kuemper to Anthony Cirelli who fired it into the net. Although Kuemper's mask had come off during the play, it was still ruled a goal due to the continuation of the puck. In the second period, the Avalanche poured off 17 shots compared to the Lightning's seven shots. Both teams ended up scoring this period. Colorado got the equalizer on the power-play when Nathan MacKinnon passed to Mikko Rantanen who passed to the front of the net and MacKinnon redirected the puck in with his skate. Tampa Bay regained the lead as defenceman Victor Hedman led the rush into the offensive zone, slipping by the defenders, and backhanding a shot over Kuemper for 2–1 advantage. However, as the teams switched on shots again, this time with Tampa Bay shooting ten times compared to Colorado's six, the Avalanche tied the game. As the Avalanche were working the point, Darren Helm shot at Andrei Vasilevskiy and the rebound went to Nico Sturm whose shot deflected off of Andrew Cogliano and into the net. With the game tied at two goals apiece, the game went into overtime. In overtime, Kuemper flipped the puck ahead to Artturi Lehkonen who passed to a speeding Nazem Kadri who got the shot through Vasilevskiy and into the top part of the cage. The goal gave Colorado a 3–2 victory and a chance to win the series in Game 5 in Colorado.

Game five

With a potential Stanley Cup victory in Colorado for the Avalanche in game five, the Lightning tried to hold on to extend the series. The first period saw both teams relatively even in shots with Colorado holding a one-shot advantage. However, Tampa Bay began the scoring as Mikhail Sergachev cleared the defensive zone forwarding a pass to Corey Perry with a cross-ice pass to Jan Rutta whose slap shot found its way past Darcy Kuemper for a 1–0 lead. The second period held a different story as the Avalanche held a stronger advantage in shots and managed to tie the game, prior to Tampa Bay's proceeding goal. The Avalanche, upon winning a faceoff, had Nathan MacKinnon pass to Cale Makar who shot the puck at Andrei Vasilevskiy but the rebound bounced to Valeri Nichushkin for an easy tap-in goal. Nikita Kucherov put the Lightning up 2–1 on a 4-on-3 power-play as his one-timer through traffic found its way above Kuemper's blocker to the back of the net. Much like in game four, the Avalanche tied the game in the third period. Once Colorado was able to enter the offensive zone, they set up Makar for a wrist shot through traffic that deflected off of Vasilevskiy, rebounding to Erik Cernak's skate and pinballing through Vasilevskiy and into the net. However, the Lightning reobtained the lead with less than seven minutes left, as the Lightning worked the offensive zone, eventually leading to an Ondrej Palat one-timer that got past Kuemper for a 3–2 advantage. The Avalanche continued to press the Lightning. However, Tampa Bay held off any late attempts to win the game 3–2 and force a sixth game.

Game six

Back in Tampa for game six, the Lightning struck first during the first period. As the Lightning were working the forecheck, a giveaway by Cale Makar brought an errant deflection to Steven Stamkos who put it five-hole through Darcy Kuemper. The Avalanche managed to tie the game in the second period during their offensive zone coverage which led to a delayed penalty on Tampa Bay. On the delayed penalty, Nathan MacKinnon's shot from the short side beat Andrei Vasilevskiy. Colorado then gained the lead when a 3–on–2 involving Josh Manson, MacKinnon, and Artturi Lehkonen resulted in a wrist shot by the latter to go up 2–1. With the lead the Avalanche continued to shoot at the Lightning goaltender while also maintaining defence. The Avalanche held on to claim a 2–1 victory to win their third Stanley Cup.

Cale Makar was awarded the Conn Smythe Trophy as most valuable player during the playoffs. He became the third defenceman to win the Norris Trophy, Conn Smythe Trophy and Stanley Cup in the same year; equalling Bobby Orr and Nicklas Lidstrom in accomplishing this feat. Corey Perry became the first player in league history to be on the losing side of three consecutive Finals while playing for three different teams.

Team rosters
Years indicated in boldface under the "Finals appearance" column signify that the player won the Stanley Cup in the given year.

Tampa Bay Lightning

Colorado Avalanche

Stanley Cup engraving

The Stanley Cup was presented to Avalanche captain Gabriel Landeskog by NHL deputy commissioner Bill Daly following the Avalanche's 2–1 win in Game 6.

This is a list of 52 names that were engraved on the Stanley Cup in 2022:

2021–22 Colorado Avalanche

Engraving Notes
 #28 Ryan Murray (D) played 37 regular-season games, but did not dress in the playoffs. He had missed 39 games in the regular season due to injuries. Murray was given an exemption for spending the entire season on the Avalanche roster.
 Charlotte Grahame (Vice President of Hockey Administration) (name was included with Colorado 2001) & Curtis Leschyshyn (Pro Scout) (won the Cup as player with Colorado in 1996) had their names left off the Stanley Cup so two other Pro Scouts could get their names on the Stanley Cup for the first time. Ten more amateur scouts, two development coaches, and more team executives and club staff were left off the Stanley Cup due the 52 team name limit. All received Stanley Cup rings.

Player notes
These players were on the extended roster during the playoffs. None appeared in the playoffs. They received Stanley Cup rings, but did not qualify to have their names engraved on the Stanley Cup.

60 Justus Annunen (G 2 regular season, and 3 playoff  games dressed due to Darcy Kuemper being injured).
12 Jason Megna (C 20 regular season games)
98 Mikhail Maltsev (LW 18 regular season games)
9 Dylan Sikura (C 8 regular season games)
61 Martin Kaut (RW 6 regular season games)
67 Keaton Middleton (D 3 regular season games)
10 Roland McKeown (D only played in the minors)
32 Hunter Miska (G only played in the minors) 
50 Trent Miner (G only played in the minors)
93 Jean-Luc Foudy (C only played in the minors)

Media rights
In Canada, this was the eighth consecutive Stanley Cup Finals broadcast by Sportsnet and CBC Television in English, and TVA Sports in French. The series was also streamed on Sportsnet Now and Rogers NHL Live. Some stations in Sportsnet's sibling broadcast network Citytv also simulcast ESPN's coverage of the deciding Game 6 for simultaneous substitution purposes, similarly to how Canadian networks handled the 2019 NBA Finals.

In the United States, the series was televised on ABC and streamed on ESPN+. This was the first year of a seven-year deal in which ABC/ESPN+ broadcasts the Finals in even years, alternating with TNT. With coverage on ABC, 2022 was the first time that the Finals were carried in their entirety on broadcast television since 1980 (under the previous broadcast deal with NBC, two games were exclusive to cable). ESPN's coverage drew the Finals' highest average viewership since 2019, with 4.6 million viewers.

References

Navigation

 
Stanley Cup Finals
Stanley Cup Finals
Stanley Cup Finals
Colorado Avalanche games
Stanley Cup Finals
2020s in Denver
Tampa Bay Lightning games
Stanley Cup Finals
2020s in Tampa, Florida